The Wurla, also written Ola, or Waladjangarri, are an Aboriginal Australian people of the Kimberley region of Western Australia

Name
Though often written Ola, Wurla is now considered the recommended transcription for this tribal ethnonym.

They are also known under a number of alternative names:
 Wo:la, Wola, Wula
 Waladjangari, Woladjangari
 Woolaja
 Walandjari
 Wolmardai
 Waringari (of Ngarinjin, an exonym, also applied to the Gija, implying cannibalistic practices)
 Oladjau (Miriwung exonym for several peoples who spoke varieties of the Ngarinyin language).
 Ngarangari, Ngalangari, Ngaiangari ("those who dwell on the tops of the range.")
 Wardia

Country
The Wurlu occupied the northern side of the Wunaamin Miliwundi Range. They lay east of the Isdell Range, and their reach extended northwards as far as the Phillips Range and the headwaters of the Hann and upper Fitzroy rivers. To the east, their territory ran up to Bluff Face Range, in a line that linked directly Elgee Cliffs and the Burramundy Range. According to information gathered by Joseph Birdsell, the Wurla in penetrated down the Chapman and Durack rivers to Karunjie severed the traditional links between the Ngarinjin and Gija.

Social organisation
The Wurla were divided into clans.
 Wardia. A Wurla horde resident around Ellenbrae.

References

Sources

Aboriginal peoples of Western Australia